Studenci (Serbian Cyrillic: Студенци) is a village in the municipality of Ljubuški in West Herzegovina Canton of the Federation of Bosnia and Herzegovina, an entity of Bosnia and Herzegovina. The Kravica cascades are located near this village.

Demographics 
According to the 2013 census, its population was 1,143.

References

Populated places in Ljubuški
Villages in the Federation of Bosnia and Herzegovina